Established in 2013, Forest For The Trees is a nonprofit organization dedicated to the creation of contemporary public art. We bring local and international artists together in collaborative settings and provide resources and creative freedom to create lasting works that are publicly accessible to all of Portland, Oregon. 

Their name is derived from the popular idiom see the forest for the trees (i.e., seeing the big picture instead of focusing solely on what’s in front of you). The organization hopes to pull Portlanders away from their daily routines and help them see the city as a literal canvas and gallery for artists, pedestrians, and big thinkers alike.

Forest For The Trees is organized by artist Gage Hamilton and curator Matt Wagner of Hellion Gallery. They believe that by improving the visual landscape of the city with quality artwork, and by providing ongoing opportunities for the artistic community, we can continually grow the presence of the arts in Portland.

History
Fifteen artists participated in 2013. Mural locations and artists include:

 Southeast 9th and Stark, Marcelo Macedo
 Southeast 26th and Steele, Taka Sudo
 Southwest 12th and Washington, Rone
 Southeast 9th and Oak, Yoskay Yamamoto and Taka Sudo
 Southeast 8th and Sandy, Yoskay Yamamoto and J.Shea
 Southeast 9th and Clay, MADSTEEZ and Ōyama Enrico Isamu Letter
 Southeast 12th and Madison, Kamea Hadar and Meggs
 Southeast 9th and Hawthorne, Blaine Fontana
 Northeast 20th and Sandy, Gage Hamilton and Zach Yarrington
 Northeast 21st and Alberta, Blaine Fontana, Zach Yarrington, and Jun Inoue

Twenty artists participated in 2014, creating twenty new public artworks.

In 2015, 29 artists produced 19 murals.

References

External links

2013 establishments in Oregon
Cultural organizations based in Oregon
Culture of Portland, Oregon
Non-profit organizations based in Oregon
Organizations based in Portland, Oregon
Organizations established in 2013